The 2017 Detroit Tigers season was the team's 117th season. This was the team's fourth and final year under manager Brad Ausmus. This was the first season without owner Mike Ilitch, who bought the team in 1992 and died on February 10, 2017. The Tigers 2017 uniform features a "Mr. I" patch to honor him, the grounds crew wrote "Mr. I" in the outfield of Comerica Park, and he was also honored during a ceremony at the Tigers home opener on April 7.

On September 12, the Tigers were eliminated from playoff contention for the third consecutive season. On September 22, the Tigers announced manager Brad Ausmus will not return in 2018. The team finished last in the AL Central, last in the league and tied with the San Francisco Giants for the worst record in MLB at 64–98, the team's lowest win total since 2003. Because the Tigers held a tiebreaker over the Giants, they received the first pick in the 2018 MLB draft. Incidentally, both teams had competed in the 2012 World Series five years earlier, which the Tigers lost.

This was ace pitcher Justin Verlander's last season with the Tigers. He had been with the team since 2005. He was traded to the Houston Astros on August 31. Verlander was the last remaining member of the 2006 American League Champion team.

Roster moves

Coaching staff
On October 5, the Tigers announced that they will exercise their 2017 option on manager Brad Ausmus.
On October 8, it was announced hitting coach Wally Joyner will not return for 2017.
On October 20, the Tigers named Lloyd McClendon hitting coach. McClendon is in his second stint on the Tigers coaching staff, after serving as the Tigers' hitting coach from 2007 to 2013. The Tigers also named longtime hitting coach of the Toledo Mud Hens, Leon Durham, assistant hitting coach, succeeding David Newhan.

Signings
On December 8, the Tigers selected relief pitcher Daniel Stumpf in the major league round of the Rule 5 draft.
On December 9, the Tigers signed second baseman Omar Infante to a minor league contract.
On December 23, the Tigers signed catcher Alex Avila to a one-year, $2 million contract.
On January 13, the Tigers avoided arbitration when they reached one-year deals with third baseman Nick Castellanos, utility player Andrew Romine, shortstop José Iglesias, and pitchers Bruce Rondón, Alex Wilson and Justin Wilson.

Releases
On December 26, free agent pitcher Bobby Parnell left the Tigers and signed a minor-league contract with the Kansas City Royals.
On January 24, free agent catcher Jarrod Saltalamacchia left the Tigers and signed a one-year, $1.25 million contract with the Toronto Blue Jays.
On February 7, free agent shortstop Erick Aybar left the Tigers and signed a one-year, $1.75 million contract with the San Diego Padres.
On March 26, the Tigers released pitcher Mark Lowe with $5.5 million still owed on his contract.
On March 30, the Tigers released pitcher Mike Pelfrey with $8 million still owed on his contract.
On June 23, the Tigers released pitcher Francisco Rodríguez.

Trades
On November 3, the Tigers traded outfielder Cameron Maybin to the Los Angeles Angels in exchange for minor league pitcher Victor Alcántara.
On January 18, the Tigers acquired outfielder Mikie Mahtook from the Tampa Bay Rays in exchange for a player to be named later or cash considerations. On April 28, it was announced the Tigers traded minor-league pitcher Drew Smith to complete the trade.
On July 18, the Tigers traded outfielder J. D. Martinez to the Arizona Diamondbacks in exchange for third baseman Dawel Lugo, and shortstops Sergio Alcantara and Jose King.
On July 31, the Tigers traded catcher Alex Avila and pitcher Justin Wilson to the Chicago Cubs in exchange for infielders Jeimer Candelario and Isaac Paredes, and a player to be named later or cash considerations.
On August 31, the Tigers traded outfielder Justin Upton to the Los Angeles Angels in exchange for minor league pitcher Grayson Long and a player to be named later. On September 15, the Tigers acquired pitcher Elvin Rodriguez to complete the trade.
On August 31, the Tigers traded pitcher Justin Verlander, along with a player to be named later or cash considerations, to the Houston Astros in exchange for pitcher Franklin Pérez, outfielder Daz Cameron, and catcher Jake Rogers. On October 13, the Astros acquired outfielder Juan Ramirez to complete the trade.

Spring training
The Tigers ended spring training with a 14–21 win–loss record, excluding two tie games that did not count toward the standings.  Their .400 winning percentage was the joint-worst (along with Toronto) among American League teams in pre-season.

Season standings

American League Central

Record against opponents

Season highlights

Team accomplishments
On April 16, the Tigers established a franchise record by hitting at least one home run in each of the team's first 12 games of the season. The streak was extended to 13 games on April 18, before the Tigers went homerless on April 19. It was the second-longest streak in Major League history, one shy of the record set by the 2002 Cleveland Indians at 14 games.
On April 25, the Tigers scored 19 runs in the game, it marked the first time the team has scored 13 or more runs in consecutive games since 1993. The Tigers' 19 runs, including nine-runs in the fifth inning, were the most in a game since 2008. The Tigers recorded 24 hits, while the Seattle Mariners recorded 16 hits, as the 40 combined hits broke the Comerica Park record for most hits in a nine-inning game. The Tigers were two runs shy of its franchise record, and four hits shy of its most hits in a game.
On May 20, the Tigers hit three consecutive home runs in an inning for the first time since 2013.
On September 8, the Tigers turned their first triple play since 2001.

Individual accomplishments

Hitting
On April 4, JaCoby Jones became the first Tigers rookie to hit a home run on Opening Day since Kirk Gibson in 1980, and the first Tiger to record his first Major League home run on Opening Day since John Sullivan in 1965.
On April 11, James McCann hit his third home run of the season, becoming the first Tigers catcher in franchise history to hit three home runs in the first seven games of the season.
On April 19, Nicholas Castellanos hit two triples in the game, becoming the first Tigers player to do so since Austin Jackson in 2012.
On May 18, J. D. Martinez became the first Major League player since 1999 to record eight or more hits and eight or more walks in his first 24 plate appearances in a season.
On June 2, Miguel Cabrera recorded his 1,000th career extra-base hit, becoming the 39th player in Major League history to reach the milestone.
On July 7, Víctor Martínez recorded his 2,000th career hit, becoming the ninth active player to reach the milestone.
On July 18, Nicholas Castellanos hit a single, triple and two home runs in the game, becoming the fourth Tigers player to do since 1913, and the first Tigers player to do so since Dmitri Young in 2003.
On July 20, Miguel Cabrera recorded his 1,600th career RBI, becoming the 36th player in Major League history to reach the milestone.
On August 6, Nicholas Castellanos recorded his 500th career hit.
On September 29, Nicholas Castellanos recorded his 100th RBI of the season. He became the sixth player in Tigers history to record 10 or more triples, 25 or more home runs and 100 or more RBIs in a season, and the first player to do so since Al Kaline in 1956.

Pitching
On April 4, Justin Verlander tied a franchise record for the most strikeouts on Opening Day with 10, becoming the first Tigers player to do so since Mickey Lolich in 1970.
On June 21 against the Seattle Mariners, Justin Verlander retired the first 16 batters he faced, before a bunt hit by Jarrod Dyson in the sixth inning ruined the perfect game bid.
On July 17 against the Kansas City Royals, Jordan Zimmermann threw 79 strikes out of 97 pitches, an 81 percent strike rate that ranks as the best by a Tigers starter with 80 pitches or more since at least 1988, and was the best by a Major League starter since 2008.
On August 9 against the Pittsburgh Pirates, Justin Verlander took a no-hitter into the sixth inning, before a two-out double by Josh Bell ruined the no-hit bid.
On September 17 against the Chicago White Sox, Matthew Boyd took a no-hitter into the ninth inning, before a two-out double by Tim Anderson ruined the no-hit bid.

Defensive
On September 8, the team converted its first triple play since the 2001 season. The play was converted by Jeimer Candelario at third base, Ian Kinsler at second base,  and Efren Navarro at first base off a ball hit by Kevin Pillar of the Toronto Blue Jays.
On September 30, Andrew Romine became the fifth player in Major League history to play all nine positions in a single game, and the first player to do so since Shane Halter in 2000.

All-Stars
The Tigers sent two players to the 2017 Major League Baseball All-Star Game. Starting pitcher Michael Fulmer was named to the All-Star Game, but did not participate due to pitching on Sunday, so his teammate outfielder Justin Upton took his place on the American League roster.

Game log

|- bgcolor="bbbbbb"
| — || April 3 || @ White Sox || colspan="9" | Postponed (inclement weather). Rescheduled to April 4.
|- bgcolor="bbffbb"
| 1 || April 4 || @ White Sox || 6–3 || Verlander (1–0) || Quintana (0–1) || Rodríguez (1) || 36,534 || 1–0 || W1
|-  bgcolor="bbbbbb"
| — || April 5 || @ White Sox || colspan="9" | Postponed (inclement weather). Rescheduled to May 26.
|- bgcolor="ffbbbb"
| 2 || April 6 || @ White Sox || 2–11 || Shields (1–0) || Boyd (0–1) || — || 10,842 || 1–1 || L1
|- bgcolor="bbffbb"
| 3 || April 7 || Red Sox || 6–5 || Rodríguez (1–0) || Hembree (0–1) || — || 45,013 || 2–1 || W1
|- bgcolor="bbffbb"
| 4 || April 8 || Red Sox || 4–1 || Zimmermann (1–0) || Rodríguez (0–1) || J. Wilson (1) || 32,622 || 3–1 || W2
|- bgcolor="ffbbbb"
| 5 || April 9 || Red Sox || 5–7 || Barnes (1–0) || Rondón (0–1) || Kimbrel (2) || 33,662 || 3–2 || L1
|- bgcolor="bbffbb"
| 6 || April 10 || Red Sox || 2–1 || J. Wilson (1–0) || Sale (0–1) || Rodríguez (2) || 24,672 || 4–2 || W1
|- bgcolor="bbffbb"
| 7 || April 11 || Twins || 2–1 || Boyd (1–1) || Santiago (1–1) || Rodríguez (3) || 21,237 || 5–2 || W2
|- bgcolor="bbffbb"
| 8 || April 12 || Twins || 5–3 || Fulmer (1–0) || Gibson (0–1) || A. Wilson (1) || 23,738 || 6–2 || W3
|- bgcolor="ffbbbb"
| 9 || April 13 || Twins || 5–11 || Hughes (2–0) || Zimmermann (1–1) || Haley (1) || 22,573 || 6–3 || L1
|- bgcolor="bbffbb"
| 10 || April 14 || @ Indians || 7–6 || Norris (1–0) || Bauer (0–2) || Rodríguez (4) || 25,423 || 7–3 || W1
|- bgcolor="ffbbbb"
| 11 || April 15 || @ Indians || 6–13 || Kluber (1–1) || Verlander (1–1) || — || 26,691 || 7–4 || L1
|- bgcolor="bbffbb"
| 12 || April 16 || @ Indians || 4–1 || Boyd (2–1) || Carrasco (1–1) || Rodríguez (5) || 17,739 || 8–4 || W1
|- bgcolor="ffbbbb"
| 13 || April 18 || @ Rays || 1–5 || Andriese (1–0) || Fulmer (1–1) || — || 16,265 || 8–5 || L1
|- bgcolor="ffbbbb"
| 14 || April 19 || @ Rays || 7–8 || Pruitt (1–0) || Rodríguez (1–1) || — || 12,281 || 8–6 || L2
|- bgcolor="ffbbbb"
| 15 || April 20 || @ Rays || 1–8 || Ramírez (2–0) || Norris (1–1) || — || 13,267 || 8–7 || L3
|- bgcolor="ffbbbb"
| 16 || April 21 || @ Twins || 3–6 || Santiago (2–1) || Verlander (1–2) || Kintzler (4) || 22,647 || 8–8 || L4
|- bgcolor="bbffbb"
| 17 || April 22 || @ Twins || 5–4 || Hardy (1–0) || Tonkin (0–1) || Rodríguez (6) || 25,719 || 9–8 || W1
|- bgcolor="bbffbb"
| 18 || April 23 || @ Twins || 13–4 || Fulmer (2–1) || Gibson (0–3) || — || 26,713 || 10–8 || W2
|- bgcolor="bbffbb"
| 19 || April 25 || Mariners || 19–9 || Zimmermann (2–1) || Hernández (2–2) || — || 22,728 || 11–8 || W3
|- bgcolor="ffbbbb"
| 20 || April 26 || Mariners || 0–8 || Paxton (3–0) || Norris (1–2) || — || 23,327 || 11–9 || L1
|- bgcolor="ffbbbb"
| 21 || April 27 || Mariners || 1–2 || Zych (1–0) || Rodríguez (1–2) || Díaz (3) || 25,325 || 11–10 || L2
|- bgcolor="ffbbbb"
| 22 || April 28 || White Sox || 3–7 || Swarzak (2–0) || A. Wilson (0–1) || — || 26,049 || 11–11 || L3
|- bgcolor="ffbbbb"
| 23 || April 29 || White Sox || 4–6 (10) || Robertson (1–0) ||J. Wilson (1–1) || — || 36,217 || 11–12 || L4
|- bgcolor="bbffbb"
| 24 || April 30 || White Sox || 7–3 || Zimmermann (3–1) || González (3–1) || — || 26,045 || 12–12 || W1
|-

|- bgcolor="bbffbb"
| 25 || May 1 || Indians || 7–1 || Norris (2–2) || Bauer (2–3) || — || 22,045 || 13–12 || W2
|- bgcolor="bbffbb"
| 26 || May 2 || Indians || 5–2 || Verlander (2–2) || Kluber (3–2) || Rodríguez (7) || 21,799 || 14–12 || W3
|- bgcolor="ffbbbb"
| 27 || May 3 || Indians || 2–3 || Carrasco (3–2) || Boyd (2–2) || Allen (7) || 22,663 || 14–13 || L1
|- bgcolor="bbbbbb"
| — || May 4 || Indians || colspan="9" | Postponed (inclement weather). Rescheduled to July 1.
|- bgcolor="bbffbb"
| 28 || May 5 || @ Athletics || 7–2 || Fulmer (3–1) || Triggs (4–2) || — || 17,519 || 15–13 || W1
|- bgcolor="ffbbbb"
| 29 || May 6 || @ Athletics || 5–6 || Montas (1–0) || Rodríguez (1–3) || — || 16,651 || 15–14 || L1
|- bgcolor="ffbbbb"
| 30 || May 7 || @ Athletics || 6–8 || Casilla (1–1) || Rodríguez (1–4) || — || 23,227 || 15–15 || L2
|- bgcolor="bbffbb"
| 31 || May 9 || @ Diamondbacks || 7–3 || Verlander (3–2) || Ray (2–3) || — || 20,445 || 16–15 || W1
|- bgcolor="ffbbbb"
| 32 || May 10 || @ Diamondbacks || 1–7 || Godley (1–0) || Boyd (2–3) || — || 18,897 || 16–16 || L1
|- bgcolor="bbffbb"
| 33 || May 11 || @ Angels || 7–1 || Fulmer (4–1) || Ramírez (3–3) || — || 30,207 || 17–16 || W1
|- bgcolor="ffbbbb"
| 34 || May 12 || @ Angels || 0–7 || Shoemaker (2–2) || Zimmermann (3–2) || — || 44,311 || 17–17 || L1
|- bgcolor="bbffbb"
| 35 || May 13 || @ Angels || 4–3 || A. Wilson (1–1) || Norris (2–1) || J. Wilson (2) || 40,251 || 18–17 || W1
|- bgcolor="ffbbbb"
| 36 || May 14 || @ Angels || 1–4 || Meyer (2–1) || Verlander (3–3) || Norris (7) || 36,215 || 18–18 || L1
|- bgcolor="ffbbbb"
| 37 || May 16 || Orioles || 11–13 (13) || Bleier (1–1) || Rodríguez (1–5) || — || 25,109 || 18–19 || L2
|- bgcolor="bbffbb"
| 38 || May 17 || Orioles || 5–4 || Fulmer (5–1) || Jiménez (1–2) || J. Wilson (3) || 29,722 || 19–19 || W1
|- bgcolor="bbffbb"
| 39 || May 18 || Orioles || 6–5 || Zimmermann (4–2) || Bundy (5–2) || A. Wilson (2) || 32,455 || 20–19 || W2
|- bgcolor="ffbbbb"
| 40 || May 19 || Rangers || 3–5 || Martinez (1–2) || Norris (2–3) || Bush (5) || 33,122 || 20–20 || L1
|- bgcolor="bbffbb"
| 41 || May 20 || Rangers || 9–3 || Verlander (4–3) || Griffin (4–1) || — || 35,166 || 21–20 || W1
|- bgcolor="ffbbbb"
| 42 || May 21 || Rangers || 2–5 || Darvish (5–2) || Boyd (2–4) || Kela (1) || 24,080 || 21–21 || L1
|- bgcolor="ffbbbb"
| 43 || May 22 || @ Astros || 0–1 || Devenski (3–2) || Fulmer (5–2) || Giles (12) || 22,146 || 21–22 || L2
|- bgcolor="ffbbbb"
| 44 || May 23 || @ Astros || 2–6 || McCullers (5–1) || Zimmermann (4–3) || — || 23,179 || 21–23 || L3
|- bgcolor="bbffbb"
| 45 || May 24 || @ Astros || 6–3 || Greene (1–0) || Devenski (3–3) || — || 26,481 || 22–23 || W1
|- bgcolor="ffbbbb"
| 46 || May 25 || @ Astros || 6–7 || Gregerson (2–1) || A. Wilson (1–2) || Giles (13) || 25,046 || 22–24 || L1
|- bgcolor="bbbbbb"
| — || May 26 || @ White Sox || colspan="9" | Postponed (rain). Rescheduled to May 27.
|- bgcolor="ffbbbb"
| 47 || May 26 || @ White Sox || 2–8 || Pelfrey (2–4) || Boyd (2–5) || — || 17,842 || 22–25 || L2
|- bgcolor="ffbbbb"
| 48 || May 27 || @ White Sox || 0–3 || Danish (1–0) || Fulmer (5–3) || Robertson (6) || 26,327 || 22–26 || L3
|- bgcolor="bbffbb"
| 49 || May 27 || @ White Sox || 4–3 || Farmer (1–0) || Holland (4–4) || — || 26,327 || 23–26 || W1
|- bgcolor="ffbbbb"
| 50 || May 28 || @ White Sox || 3–7 || González (4–5)  || Zimmermann (4–4) || Robertson (7) || 27,578 || 23–27 || L1
|- bgcolor="bbffbb"
| 51 || May 29 || @ Royals || 10–7 || Rodríguez (2–5) || Soria (2–2) || J. Wilson (4) || 28,419 || 24–27 || W1
|- bgcolor="ffbbbb"
| 52 || May 30 || @ Royals || 0–1 || Skoglund (1–0) || Verlander (4–4) || Herrera (12) || 21,864 || 24–28 || L1
|- bgcolor="bbffbb"
| 53 || May 31 || @ Royals || 6–5 || Saupold (1–0) || Kennedy (0–5) || J. Wilson (5) || 24,347 || 25–28 || W1
|-

|- bgcolor="bbffbb"
| 54 || June 2 || White Sox || 15–5 || Fulmer (6–3) || Holland (4–5) || — || 28,619 || 26–28 || W2
|- bgcolor="bbffbb"
| 55 || June 3 || White Sox || 10–1 || Zimmermann (5–4) || González (4–6) || — || 33,188 || 27–28 || W3
|- bgcolor="bbffbb"
| 56 || June 4 || White Sox || 7–4 || J. Wilson (2–1) || Robertson (3–2) || — || 30,208 || 28–28 || W4
|- bgcolor="ffbbbb"
| 57 || June 6 || Angels || 3–5 || Chavez (5–6) || D. Norris (2–4) || B. Norris (11) || 24,175 || 28–29 || L1
|- bgcolor="bbffbb"
| 58 || June 7 || Angels || 4–0 || Farmer (2–0) || Meyer (2–3) || — || 24,958 || 29–29 || W1
|- bgcolor="ffbbbb"
| 59 || June 8 || Angels || 4–11 || Ramírez (6–4) || Fulmer (6–4) || — || 34,810 || 29–30 || L1
|- bgcolor="ffbbbb"
| 60 || June 9 || @ Red Sox || 3–5 || Barnes (4–2) || A. Wilson (1–3) || Kimbrel (18) || 36,853 || 29–31 || L2
|- bgcolor="ffbbbb"
| 61 || June 10 || @ Red Sox || 3–11 || Sale (8–2) || Saupold (1–1) || — || 37,162 || 29–32 || L3
|- bgcolor="bbffbb"
| 62 || June 11 || @ Red Sox || 8–3 || Norris (3–4) || Pomeranz (6–4) || — || 35,457 || 30–32 || W1
|- bgcolor="ffbbbb"
| 63 || June 13 || Diamondbacks || 6–7 || Bradley (2–1) || J. Wilson (2–2) || Rodney (17) || 25,119 || 30–33 || L1
|- bgcolor="ffbbbb"
| 64 || June 14 || Diamondbacks || 1–2 || Walker (5–3) || Zimmermann (5–5) || Rodney (18) || 26,134 || 30–34 || L2
|- bgcolor="bbffbb"
| 65 || June 15 || Rays || 5–3 || J. Wilson (3–2) || Hunter (0–2) || — || 24,056 || 31–34 || W1
|- bgcolor="bbffbb"
| 66 || June 16 || Rays || 13–4 || Norris (4–4) || Ramírez (3–2) || — || 29,674 || 32–34 || W2
|- bgcolor="ffbbbb"
| 67 || June 17 || Rays || 2–3 || Archer (5–4) || Fulmer (6–5) || Colomé (19) || 33,478 || 32–35 || L1
|- bgcolor="ffbbbb"
| 68 || June 18 || Rays || 1–9 || Faria (3–0) || Farmer (2–1) || — || 36,442 || 32–36 || L2
|- bgcolor="ffbbbb"
| 69 || June 19 || @ Mariners || 2–6 || Pazos (2–1) || A. Wilson (1–4) || — || 21,517 || 32–37 || L3
|- bgcolor="ffbbbb"
| 70 || June 20 || @ Mariners || 4–5 (10) || Cishek (1–1) || J. Wilson (3–3) || — || 15,063 || 32–38 || L4
|- bgcolor="ffbbbb"
| 71 || June 21 || @ Mariners || 5–7 || Zych (3–2) || Greene (1–1) || Díaz (12) || 18,526 || 32–39 || L5
|- bgcolor="ffbbbb"
| 72 || June 22 || @ Mariners || 6–9 || Moore (1–0) || Norris (4–5) || Cishek (1) || 18,736 || 32–40 || L6
|- bgcolor="ffbbbb"
| 73 || June 23 || @ Padres || 0–1 || Perdomo (2–4) || Fulmer (6–6) || Maurer (14) || 25,477 || 32–41 || L7
|- bgcolor="ffbbbb"
| 74 || June 24 || @ Padres || 3–7 || Yates (2–1) || Greene (1–2) || — || 31,749 || 32–42 || L8
|- bgcolor="bbffbb"
| 75 || June 25 || @ Padres || 7–5 || Rondón (1–1) || Maurer (0–4) || J. Wilson (6) || 29,595 || 33–42 || W1
|- bgcolor="bbffbb"
| 76 || June 27 || Royals || 5–3 || Verlander (5–4) || Strahm (2–5) || J. Wilson (7) || 29,488 || 34–42 || W2
|- bgcolor="ffbbbb"
| 77 || June 28 || Royals || 2–8 || Kennedy (2–6) || Norris (4–6) || — || 29,614 || 34–43 || L1
|- bgcolor="bbffbb"
| 78 || June 29 || Royals || 7–3 || Fulmer (7–6) || Junis (2–2) || — || 33,681 || 35–43 || W1
|- bgcolor="bbbbbb"
| — || June 30 || Indians || colspan="9" | Postponed (rain). Rescheduled to September 1.
|-

|- bgcolor="bbffbb"
| 79 || July 1 || Indians || 7–4 || Greene (2–2) || Shaw (2–3) || J. Wilson (8) || 28,719 || 36–43 || W2
|- bgcolor="ffbbbb"
| 80 || July 1 || Indians || 1–4 || Carrasco (9–3) || Zimmermann (5–6) || Miller (2) || 27,016 || 36–44 || L1
|- bgcolor="ffbbbb"
| 81 || July 2 || Indians || 8–11 || Clevinger (4–3) || Verlander (5–5) || Allen (16) || 30,429 || 36–45 || L2
|- bgcolor="bbffbb"
| 82 || July 4 || Giants || 5–3 || Fulmer (8–6) || Cain (3–8) || J. Wilson (9) || 32,514 || 37–45 || W1
|- bgcolor="ffbbbb"
| 83 || July 5 || Giants || 4–5 || Blach (6–5) || Norris (4–7) || Dyson (3) || 26,631 || 37–46 || L1
|- bgcolor="bbffbb"
| 84 || July 6 || Giants || 6–2 || Sánchez (1–0) || Stratton (0–2) || — || 27,210 || 38–46 || W1
|- bgcolor="ffbbbb"
| 85 || July 7 || @ Indians || 2–11 || Carrasco (10–3) || Zimmermann (5–7) || — || 32,307 || 38–47 || L1
|- bgcolor="ffbbbb"
| 86 || July 8 || @ Indians || 0–4 || Clevinger (5–3) || Verlander (5–6) || — || 34,726 || 38–48 || L2
|- bgcolor="bbffbb"
| 87 || July 9 || @ Indians || 5–3 || Fulmer (9–6) || Goody (1–1) || J. Wilson (10) || 24,519 || 39–48 || W1
|- bgcolor="ffbbbb"
| 88 || July 14 || Blue Jays || 2–7 || Sanchez (1–2) || Verlander (5–7) || — || 37,879 || 39–49 || L1
|- bgcolor="bbffbb"
| 89 || July 15 || Blue Jays || 11–1 || Fulmer (10–6) || Liriano (5–5) || — || 40,056 || 40–49 || W1
|- bgcolor="bbffbb"
| 90 || July 16 || Blue Jays || 6–5 (11) || Saupold (2–1) || Beliveau (1–1) || — || 37,173 || 41–49 || W2
|- bgcolor="bbffbb"
| 91 || July 17 || @ Royals || 10–2 || Zimmermann (6–7) || Vargas (12–4) || — || 26,359 || 42–49 || W3
|- bgcolor="bbffbb"
| 92 || July 18 || @ Royals || 9–3 || Boyd (3–5) || Wood (1–3) || — || 22,908 || 43–49 || W4
|- bgcolor="ffbbbb"
| 93 || July 19 || @ Royals || 3–4 || McCarthy (1–0) || J. Wilson (3–4) || — || 30,105 || 43–50 || L1
|- bgcolor="ffbbbb"
| 94 || July 20 || @ Royals || 4–16 || Duffy (6–6) || Fulmer (10–7) || — || 29,018 || 43–51 || L2
|- bgcolor="bbffbb"
| 95 || July 21 || @ Twins || 6–3 || Sánchez (2–0) || Santana (11–7) || J. Wilson (11) || 22,369 || 44–51 || W1
|- bgcolor="ffbbbb"
| 96 || July 22 || @ Twins || 5–6 || Gibson (6–8) || Zimmermann (6–8) || Kintzler (27) || 33,700 || 44–52 || L1
|- bgcolor="bbffbb"
| 97 || July 23 || @ Twins || 9–6 || Boyd (4–5) || Hildenberger (1–1) || J. Wilson (12) || 28,373 || 45–52 || W1
|- bgcolor="ffbbbb"
| 98 || July 24 || Royals || 3–5 (12) || Junis (3–2) || VerHagen (0–1) || Herrera (20) || 26,415 || 45–53 || L1
|- bgcolor="ffbbbb"
| 99 || July 25 || Royals || 1–3 || Duffy (7–6) || Fulmer (10–8) || Herrera (21) || 27,259 || 45–54 || L2
|- bgcolor="ffbbbb"
| 100 || July 26 || Royals || 2–16 || Kennedy (4–6) || Sánchez (2–1) || — || 29,073 || 45–55 || L3
|- bgcolor="ffbbbb"
| 101 || July 28 || Astros || 5–6 || Peacock (9–1) || Rondón (1–2) || Giles (22) || 30,358 || 45–56 || L4
|- bgcolor="bbffbb"
| 102 || July 29 || Astros || 5–3 || Boyd (5–5) || Martes (3–1) || J. Wilson (13) || 33,766 || 46–56 || W1
|- bgcolor="bbffbb"
| 103 || July 30 || Astros || 13–1 || Verlander (6–7) || McCullers (7–3) || — || 31,970 || 47–56 || W2
|- bgcolor="ffbbbb"
| 104 || July 31 || @ Yankees || 3–7 || Severino (8–4) || Fulmer (10–9) || Chapman (13) || 39,904 || 47–57 || L1
|-

|- bgcolor="bbffbb"
| 105 || August 1 || @ Yankees || 4–3 || Sánchez (3–1) || Sabathia (9–4) || Greene (1) || 43,238 || 48–57 || W1
|- bgcolor="bbffbb"
| 106 || August 2 || @ Yankees || 2–0 || Zimmermann (7–8) || Tanaka (8–10) || Greene (2) || 43,379 || 49–57 || W2
|- bgcolor="bbffbb"
| 107 || August 3 || @ Orioles || 7–5 || Saupold (3–1) || Tillman (1–7) || Greene (3) || 17,157 || 50–57 || W3
|- bgcolor="bbffbb"
| 108 || August 4 || @ Orioles || 5–2 || Verlander (7–7) || Givens (7–1) || Rondón (1) || 22,882 || 51–57 || W4
|- bgcolor="ffbbbb"
| 109 || August 5 || @ Orioles || 2–5 || Brach (3–2) || Jiménez (0–1) || Britton (9) || 33,911 || 51–58 || L1
|- bgcolor="ffbbbb"
| 110 || August 6 || @ Orioles || 3–12 || Jiménez (5–7) || Sánchez (3–2) || — || 30,144 || 51–59 || L2
|- bgcolor="ffbbbb"
| 111 || August 7 || @ Pirates || 0–3 || Williams (5–4) || Zimmermann (7–9) || Nicasio (2) || 21,651 || 51–60 || L3
|- bgcolor="ffbbbb"
| 112 || August 8 || @ Pirates || 3–6 || Kuhl (5–7) || Boyd (5–6) || Rivero (10) || 25,112 || 51–61 || L4
|- bgcolor="bbffbb"
| 113 || August 9 || Pirates || 10–0 || Verlander (8–7) || Nova (10–9) || — || 28,902 || 52–61 || W1
|- bgcolor="ffbbbb"
| 114 || August 10 || Pirates || 5–7 || Cole (10–8) || VerHagen (0–2) || Rivero (11) || 33,490 || 52–62 || L1
|- bgcolor="ffbbbb"
| 115 || August 11 || Twins || 4–9 || Pressly (2–2) || Sánchez (3–3) || — || 29,733 || 52–63 || L2
|- bgcolor="bbffbb"
| 116 || August 12 || Twins || 12–11 || Greene (3–2) || Belisle (0–2) || — || 33,006 || 53–63 || W1
|- bgcolor="ffbbbb"
| 117 || August 13 || Twins || 4–6 || Duffey (2–3) ||  Rondón (1–3) || Hildenberger (1) || 30,582 || 53–64 || L1
|- bgcolor="ffbbbb"
| 118 || August 14 || @ Rangers || 2–6 || Pérez (7–10) || Fulmer (10–10) || — || 21,041 || 53–65 || L2
|- bgcolor="ffbbbb"
| 119 || August 15 || @ Rangers || 4–10 || Griffin (6–3) || Verlander (8–8) || — || 20,636 || 53–66 || L3
|- bgcolor="ffbbbb"
| 120 || August 16 || @ Rangers || 6–12 || Hamels (8–1) || Bell (0–1) || — || 22,713 || 53–67 || L4
|- bgcolor="ffbbbb"
| 121 || August 18 || Dodgers || 5–8 || Hill (9–4) || Zimmermann (7–10) || — || 32,801 || 53–68 || L5
|- bgcolor="ffbbbb"
| 122 || August 19 || Dodgers || 0–3 || Stripling (3–4) || Fulmer (10–11)  || Jansen (33) || 37,182 || 53–69 || L6
|- bgcolor="bbffbb"
| 123 || August 20 || Dodgers || 6–1 || Verlander (9–8) || Maeda (11–5) || — || 30,901 || 54–69 || W1
|- bgcolor="ffbbbb"
| 124 || August 22 || Yankees || 4–13 || Tanaka (9–10) || Boyd (5–7) || — || 27,818 || 54–70 || L1
|- bgcolor="ffbbbb"
| 125 || August 23 || Yankees || 2–10 || Severino (11–5) || Zimmermann (7–11) || — || 29,695 || 54–71 || L2
|- bgcolor="bbffbb"
| 126 || August 24 || Yankees || 10–6 || A. Wilson (2–4) || Betances (3–5) || Greene (4) || 32,622 || 55–71 || W1
|- bgcolor="ffbbbb"
| 127 || August 25 || @ White Sox || 2–3 || Minaya (2–1) || Jiménez (0–2) || — || 23,171 || 55–72 || L1
|- bgcolor="bbffbb"
| 128 || August 26 || @ White Sox || 6–3 || Farmer (3–1) || Rodon (2–5) || Greene (5) || 29,489 || 56–72 || W1
|- bgcolor="ffbbbb"
| 129 || August 27 || @ White Sox || 1–7 || Giolito (1–1) || Boyd (5–8) || — || 22,532 || 56–73 || L1
|- bgcolor="bbffbb"
| 130 || August 28 || @ Rockies || 4–3 || Zimmermann (8–11) || Senzatela (10–5) || Greene (6) || 30,754 || 57–73 || W1
|- bgcolor="ffbbbb"
| 131 || August 29 || @ Rockies || 3–7 || Neshek (5–3) || Fulmer (10–12) || — || 30,721 || 57–74 || L1
|- bgcolor="bbffbb"
| 132 || August 30 || @ Rockies || 6–2 || Verlander (10–8) || Bettis (0–2) || — || 29,281 || 58–74 || W1
|-

|- bgcolor="ffbbbb"
| 133 || September 1 || Indians || 2–3 || Allen (2–6) || Greene (3–3) || Smith (1) || 26,093 || 58–75 || L1
|- bgcolor="ffbbbb"
| 134 || September 1 || Indians || 0–10 || Clevinger (8–5) || Farmer (3–2) || — || 24,342 || 58–76 || L2
|- bgcolor="ffbbbb"
| 135 || September 2 || Indians || 2–5 || Kluber (14–4) || Zimmermann (8–12) || Allen (23) || 25,272 || 58–77 || L3
|- bgcolor="ffbbbb"
| 136 || September 3 || Indians || 1–11 || Tomlin (8–9) || Bell (0–2) || — || 25,244 || 58–78 || L4
|- bgcolor="ffbbbb"
| 137 || September 4 || Royals || 6–7 || Junis (7–2) || Lewicki (0–1) || Alexander (3) || 24,804 || 58–79 || L5
|- bgcolor="bbffbb"
| 138 || September 5 || Royals || 13–2 || Jaye (1–0) || Vargas (14–10) || — || 22,547 || 59–79 || W1
|- bgcolor="ffbbbb"
| 139 || September 6 || Royals || 2–13 || Hammel (8–10) || Boyd (5–9) || — || 23,755 || 59–80 || L1
|- bgcolor="bbffbb"
| 140 || September 8 || @ Blue Jays || 5–4 || Farmer (4–2) || Stroman (11–7) || Greene (7) || 31,961 || 60–80 || W1
|- bgcolor="ffbbbb"
| 141 || September 9 || @ Blue Jays || 4–5 || Anderson (3–3) || Saupold (3–2) || Tepera (2) || 44,218 || 60–81 || L1
|- bgcolor="ffbbbb"
| 142 || September 10 || @ Blue Jays || 2–8 || Happ (8–10) || Sánchez (3–4) || Santos (1) || 39,797 || 60–82 || L2
|- bgcolor="ffbbbb"
| 143 || September 11 || @ Indians || 0–11 || Carrasco (15–6) || Jaye (1–1) || — || 18,521 || 60–83 || L3
|- bgcolor="ffbbbb"
| 144 || September 12 || @ Indians || 0–2 || Kluber (16–4) || Boyd (5–10) || — || 24,654 || 60–84 || L4
|- bgcolor="ffbbbb"
| 145 || September 13 || @ Indians || 3–5 || Clevinger (10–5) || Farmer (4–3) || Allen (27) || 29,346 || 60–85 || L5
|- bgcolor="ffbbbb"
| 146 || September 14 || White Sox || 7–17 || Shields (4–6) || Bell (0–3) || — || 26,743 || 60–86 || L6
|- bgcolor="bbffbb"
| 147 || September 15 || White Sox || 3–2 || Greene (4–3) || Alburquerque (0–2) || — || 25,298 || 61–86 || W1
|- bgcolor="ffbbbb"
| 148 || September 16 || White Sox || 4–10 || López (2–3) || Jaye (1–2) || — || 29,846 || 61–87 || L1
|- bgcolor="bbffbb"
| 149 || September 17 || White Sox || 12–0 || Boyd (6–10) || Covey (0–6) || — || 25,663 || 62–87 || W1
|- bgcolor="ffbbbb"
| 150 || September 18 || Athletics || 3–8 || Hendriks (4–2) || Farmer (4–4) || — || 23,895 || 62–88 || L1
|- bgcolor="ffbbbb"
| 151 || September 19 || Athletics || 8–9 || Casilla (4–5) || A. Wilson (2–5) || Treinen (9) || 23,460 || 62–89 || L2
|- bgcolor="ffbbbb"
| 152 || September 20 || Athletics || 2–3 || Mengden (2–1) || Sánchez (3–5) || Hendriks (1) || 26,913 || 62–90 || L3
|- bgcolor="ffbbbb"
| 153 || September 21 || Twins || 1–12 || Gee (3–2) || Zimmermann (8–13) || — || 25,437 || 62–91 || L4
|- bgcolor="ffbbbb"
| 154 || September 22 || Twins || 3–7 || Gibson (12–10) || Norris (4–8) || — || 25,390 || 62–92 || L5
|- bgcolor="ffbbbb"
| 155 || September 23 || Twins || 4–10 || Santana (16–8) || Stumpf (0–1) || — || 26,800 || 62–93 || L6
|- bgcolor="ffbbbb"
| 156 || September 24 || Twins || 4–10 || Berríos (13–8) || Farmer (4–5) || — || 23,882 || 62–94 || L7
|- bgcolor="ffbbbb"
| 157 || September 26 || @ Royals || 1–2 || Vargas (18–10) || Sánchez (3–6) || Minor (3) || 20,613 || 62–95 || L8
|- bgcolor="ffbbbb"
| 158 || September 27 || @ Royals || 4–7 || Alexander (5–4) || VerHagen (0–3) || Minor (4) || 21,319 || 62–96 || L9
|- bgcolor="bbffbb"
| 159 || September 28 || @ Royals || 4–1 || Norris (5–8) || Duffy (9–10) || Greene (8) || 21,650 || 63–96 || W1
|- bgcolor="ffbbbb"
| 160 || September 29 || @ Twins || 3–6 || Berríos (14–8) || Boyd (6–11) || Belisle (9) || 34,580 || 63–97 || L1
|- bgcolor="bbffbb"
| 161 || September 30 || @ Twins || 3–2 || Farmer (5–5) || Slegers (0–1) || Greene (9) || 35,515 || 64–97 || W1
|- bgcolor="ffbbbb"
| 162 || October 1 || @ Twins || 1–5 || Colón (5–6) || Sánchez (3–7) || Moya (1) || 28,148 || 64–98 || L1
|-

|- style="text-align:center;"
| Legend:       = Win       = Loss       = PostponementBold = Tigers team member

Roster

Player stats

Batting

Note: G = Games played; AB = At bats; R = Runs scored; H = Hits; 2B = Doubles; 3B = Triples; HR = Home runs; RBI = Runs batted in; AVG = Batting average; SB = Stolen bases

+Totals with Tigers only.

Pitching

Starters

Note: W = Wins; L = Losses; ERA = Earned run average; G = Games pitched; GS = Games started; SV = Saves; IP = Innings pitched; R = Runs allowed; ER = Earned runs allowed; BB = Walks allowed; K = Strikeouts

+Totals with Tigers only.

Bullpen
Note: W = Wins; L = Losses; ERA = Earned run average; G = Games pitched; GS = Games started; SV = Saves; IP = Innings pitched; R = Runs allowed; ER = Earned runs allowed; BB = Walks allowed; K = Strikeouts

+Totals with Tigers only.

Farm system

References

External links

2017 Detroit Tigers at Baseball Reference
Detroit Tigers official site

Detroit Tigers seasons
Detroit Tigers
Detroit Tigers
2017 in Detroit